Grand River Naval Depot was a planned base on Lake Erie in what is now Port Maitland, Ontario, Canada.

Located at the mouth of the Grand River, the naval base was to have been built as a second naval base on Lake Erie intended to complement the base at Navy Island. It was to have stationed 1,000 sailors and 3 frigates. It was never completed and the site was abandoned by the Royal Navy. It is now the site of Esplanade Park in Port Maitland.

In 1815 Commodore Sir Edward Campbell Rich Owen had sent a letter to Lieutenant General Gordon Drummond of interest to establish a naval shipyard in the area and land was acquired from the Six Nations but nothing beyond the establishment of naval base with personnel was established in 1816.

Following the Rush Bagot Treaty, the based slowly wound down, but an 1820 survey was ordered and the based was re-established but closed one last time in 1834.

See also
 Battle of Lake Erie
 Navy Island Royal Naval Shipyard

References

External links
 Canadian Historical Naval Ships and Yards
 Grand River Naval Depot

Military of Canada
Royal Navy bases in Canada
Royal Navy dockyards in Canada